Holmen AB is a Swedish company which bases its business in the forest industry and the pulp and paper industry. Holmen's main products are paperboard for consumer packaging and graphical applications. Printing paper for magazines, supplements, direct mail, directories, books and newspapers. They also produce sawn timber for flooring, window components, furniture or construction.

History
Holmen was originally called Mo och Domsjö AB (MoDo), a Swedish company created in 1874. 
Carl Kempe (1799-1872), a Pomeranian-born merchant, originally partnered with his brother-in-law, but was from 1836 single owner of a sawmill in Mo, at the river Moälven, near Örnsköldsvik in northern Sweden. Carl Kempe later established a steam-powered sawmill at Domsjö on Moälven. The latter has been running as an independent company called Domsjö Fabriker since 2000, and in 2011 it was acquired by India's Aditya Birla Group.

The company Mo och Domsjö AB was created in 1874 by Carl Kempe's sons from these holdings, among several other industries controlled by the Kempe family. It was led at various times by the brothers Bernhard (1830-1908), Wilhelm and Frans Kempe (1847-1924) and remained in the control of the Kempe family for most of the next century.

Originally producing and exporting timber, the company moved into pulp and paper at the end of the 19th and early years of the 20th century and into wood-based chemicals during the middle part of the 20th century. The name was usually abbreviated to Modo and has since 1963 through sponsoring given name to the ice hockey team Modo Hockey.

The company was merged with the Norrköping-based industrial company Holmens Bruk AB in 1988 under the name Mo och Domsjö AB.

In February 2000, the group changed its name to Holmen AB.

In June 2016 the newsprint mill in Madrid, Spain, was sold to International Paper.

Organisation

Holmen consists of several subsidiaries: Holmen Paper, Iggesund Paperboard, Iggesund Timber, Holmen Skog and Holmen Energi whereas the largest one is Holmen Paper with a total of two paper mills in Sweden; Hallsta and Braviken. 
Iggesund Paperboard has two paperboard mills; one in Iggesund, Sweden and one in Workington, England,

Sustainability
In January 2017 Holmen was ranked number 21 on the Global 100.

Owners
The largest owner in Holmen is L E Lundbergföretagen, controlled by billionaire Fredrik Lundberg with 32.9% of the shares and 61.6% of the total vote.

Markets
The European market makes up about 88% of Holmen's total net sales. Holmen's single largest market is Sweden, with 24% of the net sales.

Products
The business area Iggesund Paperboard produces paperboard for use in the premium packaging and graphics sectors. The brands consist of Invercote, produced at the Iggesund Mill and Incada produced at the Workington Mill.

The business area Holmen Paper produces paper for magazines, catalogues, direct mail, supplements, book paper and gift wrap at the two paper mills. The brands include: Holmen TRND, Holmen VIEW, Holmen UNIQ, Holmen NEWS, Holmen GIFT, Holmen XLNT, Holmen PLUS, Holmen BOOK.

The business area Holmen Timber makes construction timber and joinery timber at three sawmills in Sweden.

References

External links
 Holmen official site

Manufacturing companies based in Stockholm
Pulp and paper companies of Sweden
Companies listed on Nasdaq Stockholm
Manufacturing companies established in 1875
Forest products companies
Swedish companies established in 1875